St. Paul's Church or St Paul's Church or any variation thereof may refer to:

Belgium 
 St. Paul's Church, Antwerp

Canada 
 St. Paul's, Bloor Street, Toronto, Ontario
 St. Paul's Church (Halifax),  Canada's oldest Protestant church
 St. Paul's Eastern United Church, Ottawa, Ontario
 St. Paul's Presbyterian Church (Leaskdale), Ontario
 St. Paul's Anglican Church (Dawson City), a National Historic Site of Canada

China 
 St. Paul's Church, Nanjing

Denmark 
 St. Paul's Church, Aarhus
 St. Paul's Church, Bornholm
 St. Paul's Church, Copenhagen
 St. Paul's Church, Hadsten

France 
 St. Paul's Church, Strasbourg

Germany 
 St. Paul's Church, Frankfurt am Main, location of the 1849 Frankfurt Constitution
 Paulinerkirche, Leipzig, a destroyed church in Leipzig

Hong Kong

India 
 St. Paul's Church, Bangalore
 St. Paul's Church, Diu, a Portuguese colonial church in Diu
 St. Paul's Church, Landour, an Anglican church in Landour Cantonment, Uttarakhand State
 St. Paul's Church, Mangalore

Indonesia 
 St. Paul's Church, Jakarta, another name for Gereja Paulus Jakarta

Ireland 
 St. Paul's Church, Banagher, County Offaly
 St. Paul's Church, Bray, County Wicklow
 St. Paul's Church, Dublin
 St. Paul's Church, Mullingar

Isle of Man 
 St Paul's, Ramsey, Isle of Man, one of Isle of Man's Registered Buildings

Italy 
 St. Paul's Church, Brugherio
 St. Paul's Church, Mirabello
 St. Paul's Within the Walls, Rome

Macao 
 Ruins of St. Paul's, the ruins of what was the 17th-century Cathedral of St. Paul, also called the St Paul's Church, in Macao

Malaysia 
 St. Paul's Church, Malacca

Malta 
 St Paul's Church, Cospicua
 Collegiate church of St Paul, Rabat
 St Paul's Church, Munxar
 St Paul's Church, Safi
 Collegiate Parish Church of St Paul's Shipwreck, Valletta

Monaco 
 St. Paul Church, Monaco

New Zealand 
 Old St Paul's, Wellington
 St Paul's Church, Auckland

Norway 
 Paulus Church, Oslo

Pakistan 
 St. Paul's Church, Manora, Karachi
 St. Paul's Church, Rawalpindi

Portugal 
 St Paul's Church, Braga

Singapore 
 St. Paul's Church, Singapore, an Anglican church located in Kovan, Singapore

Sri Lanka 
 St. Paul's Church, Kandy
 St. Paul's Church, Milagiriya

Sweden 
 St. Paul's Church, Mariatorget, Stockholm
 St. Paul's Church, Malmö

Switzerland 
 St. Paul's Church, Basel
 St. Paul's Church, Bern

Syria 
 Chapel of Saint Paul, Damascus

Turkey 
 St. Paul's Church, Antakya
 Saint Paul's Church, Tarsus

United Kingdom

England
 St Paul's Cathedral, London
 Old St Paul's Cathedral, London
 St Paul's Church, Adlington, Lancashire
 Old St Peter and St Paul's Church, Albury, Surrey
 St Paul's Church, Bedford, Bedfordshire
 St Peter and St Paul's Church, Bolton-by-Bowland, Lancashire
 St Paul's Church, Boughton, Chester
 St Paul's, Bow Common, London
 St Paul's Church, Brighton
 St Paul's Church, Bristol
 St Paul's Church, Brookhouse, Lancashire
 St Paul's, Burton upon Trent, Staffordshire
 St Paul's Church, Bury, Greater Manchester
 St Paul's, Cambridge, Cambridgeshire
 St Paul's Church, Clapham, London
 St Paul's Church, Constable Lee, Lancashire
 St Paul's, Covent Garden, London (also known as the 'Actors' Church')
 St Paul's, Deptford, London
 St Paul's Church, Dover, Kent
 St Paul's Church, East Ham, London
 St Paul's Church, Farington, Lancashire
 St Paul's Church, Gulworthy, Devon
 St Paul's, Hammersmith, London
 St Paul's Church, Harringay, London
 St Paul's Church, Helsby, Cheshire
 Old St Paul's Church, Hoddlesden, Lancashire
 St Paul's Church, Hooton, Cheshire
 St Paul's Church, Kewstoke, Somerset
 St Paul's Church, Knightsbridge, London
 St Paul's Church, Lindale, Cumbria
 Church of St Paul, Liverpool, Merseyside
 St Paul's Church, Longridge, Lancashire
 St Paul's Church, Macclesfield, Cheshire
 St Paul's Church, Marston, Cheshire (demolished)
 St James' and St Paul's Church, Marton, Cheshire
 St Paul's Church, New Southgate, London
 St Paul's Church, Newport, Isle of Wight
 St Paul's Church, Over Tabley, Cheshire
 St Paul's Church, Oxford
 St Paul's Church, Preston, Lancashire
 St Peter and St Paul's Church, Preston Deanery, Northamptonshire
 St Paul's Church, Rusthall, Kent
 St Paul's Church, Salisbury, Wiltshire
 St Paul's Church, Seacombe, Merseyside
 St Paul's Church, Scotforth, Lancaster, Lancashire
 St Paul's Church, Shadwell, London
 St Paul's Church, Stamford, Lincolnshire
 St Paul's Church, Gatten, Shanklin, Isle of Wight
 St Paul's Church and Centre, Norton Lees, Sheffield, Yorkshire
 St Paul's Church, Wordsworth Avenue, Sheffield, Yorkshire
 St Paul's Church, Skelmersdale, Lancashire
 St Paul's Church, Tintagel, Cornwall
 Church of St Paul with St Luke, Tranmere, Merseyside
 St Paul's Church, West Derby, Liverpool, Merseyside
 St Paul's Church, Winlaton, Tyne and Wear
 St Paul's Church, Witherslack, Cumbria
 St Paul Parish Church, Grange-over-Sands, Cumbria
 St Paul and St Stephen's Church, Gloucester, Gloucestershire

Scotland
 St Paul's Church, Perth
 St Paul's Parish Church, Edinburgh
 Old St. Paul's, Edinburgh

Wales
 St Paul's Church, Colwyn Bay, North Wales
 St Paul's Church, Grangetown, Cardiff
 St Paul's Church, Newport, Wales

United States

California
 St. Paul's Catholic Church (San Francisco)

Colorado
 St. Paul's Church (Marble, Colorado)

District of Columbia
 Church of St. Paul's, K Street (Washington, D.C.)
 Saint Paul African Union Methodist Church
 St. Paul's Lutheran Church (Washington, D.C.)

Florida
 Basilica of St. Paul (Daytona Beach, Florida)

Georgia
 St. Paul United Methodist Church (Atlanta)
 Saint Paul's Church (Augusta, Georgia)

Illinois
 St. Paul Catholic Church (Highland, Illinois)

Iowa
 St. Paul's Catholic Church (Burlington, Iowa)
 St. Paul United Methodist Church (Cedar Rapids, Iowa)
 St. Paul Lutheran Church (Davenport, Iowa)
 St. Paul's Episcopal Church (Durant, Iowa)
 Cathedral Church of Saint Paul (Des Moines)
 St. Paul's Episcopal Church (Harlan, Iowa)

Maryland
 Saint Paul Catholic Church (Ellicott City, Maryland)
 St. Paul's Parish Church (Brandywine, Maryland)
 St. Paul's Chapel (Crownsville, Maryland)
 St. Paul's Church (Fairlee, Maryland)

Massachusetts
 The Church of St. Paul (Harvard Square)
 Cathedral Church of St. Paul, Boston
 Saint Paul's Church, Chapel, and Parish House, Brookline
 St. Paul's Church (Dedham, Massachusetts)

Missouri
 St. Paul Catholic Church (Center, Missouri)
 St. Paul's Church (New Melle, Missouri)

New York
 St. Paul's Church (Brownville, New York)
 St. Paul's Church (Chittenango, New York)
 Saint Paul's Church National Historic Site, Mount Vernon
 St. Paul's Church (Owego, New York)
 St. Paul's Church and Cemetery (Paris Hill, New York)
 St. Paul's Chapel, New York City

North Carolina
 St. Paul's Church and Cemetery (Newton, North Carolina)

Ohio
 St. Paul Church (Over the Rhine), Cincinnati
 St. Paul Church Historic District, Cincinnati
 St. Paul Church South Bass Island, Put-in-Bay

Pennsylvania
 St. Paul's Episcopal Church (Exton, Pennsylvania), also known as St. Paul's Church (and listed as such on the National Register of Historic Places)
 St. Paul's Church (Chester, Pennsylvania)

Rhode Island
 St. Paul's Church (North Kingstown, Rhode Island)
 Saint Paul Church (Cranston, Rhode Island)
 Saint Paul's Church (Pawtucket, Rhode Island)

Texas
 St. Paul's Episcopal Church (Greenville, Texas)

Virginia
 St. Paul's Episcopal Church (Alexandria, Virginia)
 St. Paul's Episcopal Church (King George, Virginia), also known as St. Paul's Church (and listed as such on the National Register of Historic Places (NRHP))
 St. Paul's Church (Lynchburg, Virginia)
 Saint Paul's Episcopal Church (Norfolk, Virginia), also known as Saint Paul's Church (and listed as such on the NRHP)
 Saint Paul's Church (Petersburg, Virginia), NRHP-listed
 St. Paul's Episcopal Church (Richmond, Virginia), also known as St. Paul's Church (and listed as such on the NRHP)
 St. Paul's Catholic Church (Portsmouth, Virginia)

See also 
 Old St. Paul's (disambiguation) 
 St. Paul A.M.E. Church (disambiguation)
 St. Paul the Apostle Church (disambiguation)
 St. Paul's Catholic Church (disambiguation)
 St. Paul's Chapel (disambiguation)
 St. Paul's Church and Cemetery (disambiguation)
 St. Paul's Episcopal Church (disambiguation)
 St. Paul's Lutheran Church (disambiguation)
 St. Paul's Methodist Church (disambiguation)
 St. Paul's Parish Church (disambiguation)
 St. Paul's Reformed Church (disambiguation)
 St. Paul's Cathedral (disambiguation)
 St. Peter and St. Paul's Church (disambiguation)